The 1989 European Parliament election in Portugal was the election of MEP representing Portugal constituency for the 1989-1994 term of the European Parliament. It was part of the wider 1989 European election. In Portugal the election was held on 18 June.

The Social Democratic Party (PSD) won the elections with almost 33% of the votes, but lost much ground compared with 1987. Although the country was experiencing a significant economic growth at that time, the PSD saw the gap between them and the Socialists narrow to around 4%. On the other hand, the Socialist Party (PS), although failing to topple the PSD as the largest party, performed quite well gaining more than 6% of the votes and polling above 28%, compared with the 22% in 1987. They also gained 2 MEP, while the PSD lost one.

The Democratic Unity Coalition (CDU), also performed very well, winning 14% and becoming the third political force. The Communist/Green alliance was also able to win one more MEP than in 1987. The CDS saw its share of vote drop a bit, to 14% and was surpassed by CDU, as it fell to fourth place.

Turnout fell dramatically in these election, with just 51% of voters casting a ballot.

Electoral System
The voting method used, for the election of European members of parliament, is by proportional representation using the d'Hondt method, which is known to benefit leading parties. In the 1989 EU elections, Portugal had 24 seats to be filled. Deputies are elected in a single constituency, corresponding to the entire national territory.

Parties and candidates
The major parties that partook in the election, and their EP list leaders, were:

Democratic Unity Coalition (CDU), Carlos Carvalhas
Socialist Party (PS), João Cravinho
Social Democratic Party (PSD), António Capucho
Democratic and Social Centre (CDS), Francisco Lucas Pires

National summary of votes and seats

|-
! style="background-color:#E9E9E9;text-align:left;" colspan=2 |National party
! style="background-color:#E9E9E9;text-align:left;" |Europeanparty
! style="background-color:#E9E9E9;text-align:left;" |Main candidate
! style="background-color:#E9E9E9;text-align:right;" |Votes
! style="background-color:#E9E9E9;text-align:right;" |%
! style="background-color:#E9E9E9;text-align:right;" |+/–
! style="background-color:#E9E9E9;text-align:right;" |Seats
! style="background-color:#E9E9E9;text-align:right;" |+/–
|- style="text-align:right;"
| style="background-color: " width=5px|
| style="text-align:left;" | Social Democratic Party (PSD)
| style="text-align:left;" | LDR
| style="text-align:left;" | António Capucho
| 1,358,958
| 32.75	
| 4.70 
! 9
| 1 
|- style="text-align:right;"
| style="background-color: " width=5px|
| style="text-align:left;" | Socialist Party (PS)* 
| style="text-align:left;" | PES
| style="text-align:left;" | João Cravinho
| 1,184,380	
| 28.54	
| 6.26 
! 8
| 2 
|- style="text-align:right;"
| style="background-color: " width=5px|
| style="text-align:left;vertical-align:top;" | Unitary Democratic Coalition (CDU) • Communist Party (PCP)• Ecologist Party (PEV)
| style="text-align:left;vertical-align:top;" | LU
| style="text-align:left;vertical-align:top;" | Carlos Carvalhas
| style="vertical-align:top;" | 597,759
| style="vertical-align:top;" | 14.40
| style="vertical-align:top;" | 2.90 
! 431
| 0 1 
|- style="text-align:right;"
| style="background-color: " width=5px|
| style="text-align:left;" | Democratic and Social Centre (CDS)
| style="text-align:left;" | EPP
| style="text-align:left;" | Lucas Pires
| 587,497
| 14.16
| 1.34 
! 3
| 1 
|- style="text-align:right;"
| style="background-color: " width=5px|
| style="text-align:left;" | People's Monarchist Party (PPM)
| style="text-align:left;" | None
| style="text-align:left;" | Miguel Esteves Cardoso
| 84,272
| 2.03
| 0.74 
! 0
| 0 
|- style="text-align:right;"
| style="background-color:darkred" width=5px|
| style="text-align:left;" | Democratic Movement (MDP/CDE)
| style="text-align:left;" | None
| style="text-align:left;" | António Victorino de Almeida
| 56,900
| 1.37
| 0.88 
! 0
| 0 
|- style="text-align:right;"
| style="background-color:#E2062C" width=5px|
| style="text-align:left;" | People's Democratic Union (UDP)
| style="text-align:left;" | None
| style="text-align:left;" | 
| 45,017
| 1.08
| 0.14 
! 0
| 0 
|- align="right"
| style="background-color:red" width=5px|
| style="text-align:left;" | Revolutionary Socialist Party (PSR)
| style="text-align:left;" | None
| style="text-align:left;" |
| 31,775
| 0.77
| 0.26 
! 0
| 0 
|- align="right"
| style="background-color:yellow" width=5px|
| style="text-align:left;" | Christian Democratic Party (PDC)
| style="text-align:left;" | None
| style="text-align:left;" |
| 29,745
| 0.72
| 0.00 
! 0
| 0 
|- align="right"
| style="background-color: " width=5px|
| style="text-align:left;" | Workers' Communist Party (PCTP/MRPP)
| style="text-align:left;" | None
| style="text-align:left;" | António Garcia Pereira
| 26,682 
| 0.64
| 0.29 
! 0
| 0 
|- align="right"
| style="background-color: " width=5px|
| align="left"| Workers Party of Socialist Unity (POUS)
| align="left"| None
| align="left"| Carmelinda Pereira
| 11,182 
| 0.27
| new
! 0
| new
|- align="right"
| style="background-color:darkred" width=5px|
| align="left"| Left Revolutionary Front (FER)
| align="left"| None
| align="left"| 
| 7,833
| 0.19
| new
! 0
| new
|- align="right"
|- style="background-color:#E9E9E9"
| style="text-align:right;" colspan="4" | Valid votes
| 4,022,000
| 96.92
| colspan="3" rowspan="2" | 
|- style="background-color:#E9E9E9"
| style="text-align:right;" colspan="4" | Blank and invalid votes
| 127,756
| 3.08
|- style="background-color:#E9E9E9"
| style="text-align:right;" colspan="4" | Totals
| 4,149,756
| 100.00
| —
! style="background-color:#E9E9E9"|24
| 0 
|- style="background-color:#E9E9E9"
| colspan="4" | Electorate (eligible voters) and voter turnout
| 8,121,564
| 51.10
| 21.32 
| colspan="2"| 
|-
| style="text-align:left;" colspan="11" | Source: Comissão Nacional de Eleições  * = The Socialist Party list included 1 MP elected by the Democratic Renewal Party.
|}

Distribution by European group

Maps

See also
Politics of Portugal
List of political parties in Portugal
Elections in Portugal
European Parliament

References

External links
Results according to the Portuguese Electoral Commission of the 18 June 1989 election of the 24 delegates from Portugal to the European Parliament

Portugal
European Parliament elections in Portugal
1989 elections in Portugal